Francis Roy "Frank" Roberts (5 March 1945 – 7 February 2011) was an Indigenous Australian boxer who competed at the 1964 Tokyo Olympics in the welterweight division. 'Honest Frank', as he was known, was the first Indigenous Australian Olympian, and was also the youngest boxer on the Australian boxing team. He resided in Armidale, New South Wales, and gave boxing lessons to local youths, until his death from a heart attack in February 2011.

1964 Olympic results
Below is the record of Frank Roberts, an Australian welterweight boxer who competed at the 1964 Tokyo Olympics:

 Round of 32: lost to Pertti Purhonen (Finland) by decision, 0-5

References

1945 births
2011 deaths
Indigenous Australian boxers
Olympic boxers of Australia
Boxers at the 1964 Summer Olympics
Recipients of the Australian Sports Medal
Indigenous Australian Olympians
Australian male boxers
People from Armidale
Welterweight boxers
Sportsmen from New South Wales